In Slavic folklore, the naw (or  nav') are the souls of the prematurely deceased.

NAW may refer to:

Organisations
 National Assembly for Wales, now Senedd, a legislature
 National Assembly of Women, a British organisation campaigning for women's rights
 Nutzfahrzeuggesellschaft Arbon & Wetzikon, a Swiss manufacturer of motorbuses and trolleybuses

Transport
 Nai Wai stop, Hong Kong, MTR station code
 Narathiwat Airport, an airport in Thailand